Quinta may refer to: 
 Quinta (estate) in Portugal
 Quinta (musician), British multi-instrumentalist
 In medieval music theory, alternative term for diapente (perfect fifth)
 Quinta (skipper), genus of butterflies
 Claudia Quinta, Roman matron
 Quintus (vocal music), fifth voice in polyphony
 Quinta Brunson, writer and comedian
 shorthand for Biblia Hebraica Quinta, standard Hebrew Bible text
 Quinta, Cuba an alternative name for La Quinta, Cuba

See also
 Tropical Cyclone Quinta, a typhoon name used in The Philippines by PAGASA
 La Quinta (disambiguation)
 Quinta da Beloura, an affluent gated community and golf resort located in Linhó, Sintra, on the Portuguese Riviera
 Quinta Normal, Chile
 Quinta Grande, Portugal